The following are fictional characters from the 1967 film The Producers, the Broadway musical based on it, and the 2005 film adaptation of the musical.

Max Bialystock

Max Bialystock is described as selfish, arrogant, fiery, impatient, sardonic, mischievous, witty, cultured, fun, bullying, logical, charismatic, intimidating, popular and fast-talking - a man who is only interested in making quick money. Though this is later proven untrue, Max's forceful and loud nature can be quite frightful and bullying. Apparently without scruples, he is willing to do anything to make money (including "shtupping every little old lady in New York") and is often motivated, duplicitous and unwilling to cooperate diplomatically.  His name is taken from the Polish city of Białystok.

Leo Bloom
Leopold "Leo" Bloom is a timid, nervous, shy and mild-mannered accountant, prone to panic attacks and who keeps a fragment of his childhood blue blanket in his pocket to calm himself. Towards the end of the film, when Leo tries to turn himself in and use his accountant books as evidence, Max stops Leo on the way out the door and steals Leo's books, causing Leo to lose his temper and attack Max in a fit of rage, demanding the books back and repeatedly calling him "fat fatty." Nevertheless, it is Leo who first comes up with the idea of how to make money from a failed play.

The character is named after the protagonist in James Joyce's Ulysses, Leopold Bloom. Wilder's costar Zero Mostel had portrayed Joyce's Bloom on stage in the play Ulysses in Nighttown.

Ulla Inga Hansen Benson Yansen Tallen Hallen Svaden Swanson Bloom

Ulla Inga Hansen Benson Yansen Tallen Hallen Svaden Swansson (Later Bloom) is a pretty young Swedish woman who becomes Max's secretary.  In the original 1967 film, Ulla is introduced as a "toy" that Max found in the local library, and is a symbol of his newfound affluence. She can speak little English, but is a good go-go dancer, indeed she can dance far better than she can type. She also constantly says "God dag på dig", which means "good day to you" in Swedish (with a faux-Swedish accent), and provides a sexier counterpoint to Max's much older girlfriends.

In the film adapted from the musical, Ulla introduces herself as a Swedish actress looking for a part in Max and Leo's  production Springtime for Hitler. She is a stereotypical Swedish woman: tall and beautiful with lovely blonde hair. She performs a song she wrote called "When You Got It, Flaunt It". She decided to audition when a "crazy man" (Max) yelled at her the previous day. While the casting isn't to start for quite a while, Max and Leo hire her as their secretary/receptionist. Following the unwanted success of the musical, she and Leo flee to Rio de Janeiro where they marry. Her maiden name is never mentioned, but by the end of the play she is Ulla Inga Hansen Benson Yansen Tallen Hallen Svaden Swanson Bloom.

Earlier, Max and Leo ask her to clean up their place while they're gone, but she doesn't understand English very well, and after they leave, she paints Max's office entirely white. Little of her role in the Springtime for Hitler play is shown, but she plays a showgirl representing the German Imperial Eagle and later appears as Marlene Dietrich. In Max and Leo's second production, Prisoners of Love, she plays the lead prisoner/singer.

Roger De Bris

Roger Elizabeth De Bris is a flamboyant, overtly gay theatre director, described by Max Bialystock as the worst director to have ever lived, and is chosen by Bialystock in an attempt to ensure that Springtime for Hitler would flop.  He lives with his equally flamboyant partner Carmen Ghia and his production crew in a house described as an Upper East Side town house in New York.  While the musical and the 2005 film clarify his sexuality, it is only implied in the original film.  "Roger", of course, is an obvious euphemism for intercourse, and a "bris" is the Jewish circumcision ceremony, whilst the surname is also a pun on the word "debris".

Carmen Ghia

Carmen Ghia is the partner of Roger De Bris. He is played by Andreas Voutsinas in the 1967 film. In the 2001 Broadway show The Producers and the 2005 musical film The Producers he is played by Roger Bart.

The character is named after the Karmann Ghia, marketed from 1955 to 1974 by Volkswagen. Carmen Ghia is Roger De Bris' "common-law assistant". They are both flamboyantly gay and they love to flounce around their Upper East Side town house.

Voutsinas was a friend of Brooks' wife Anne Bancroft, who performed with him at The Actors Studio. She recommended him for the role of Carmen Ghia feeling his natural Greek accent would contribute to the role's comedy. According to Voutsinas, who did Ghia's own make-up, Brooks instructed him to "look like Rasputin and behave like Marilyn Monroe".

When Bart was given the lead role of Leo Bloom, he said of his old character: "As Carmen Ghia I was a sprinter. This guy is like a long-distance runner. I sometimes think to myself, 'Should I have stayed Carmen?'"

Franz Liebkind

Franz Liebkind (Liebkind being a humorous calque into German of the English idiom "love child") is a former Nazi who has penned an admiring musical tribute to Adolf Hitler, titled Springtime for Hitler.  The two protagonists, Max Bialystock and Leo Bloom, purchase and produce this "worst play ever written" as part of a plot to defraud investors by overselling and staging a sure-fire flop.

The part was originally cast for Dustin Hoffman, but Mel Brooks allowed him to audition for the film adaptation of The Graduate before shooting began for his own film in anticipation that he would be rejected, as his wife Anne Bancroft was cast as Mrs. Robinson. Instead, Hoffman was cast as the lead of the film directed by Mike Nichols and Brooks thus had to recast the Liebkind role.

Liebkind is portrayed as easily angered and emotionally unstable. The only background to his character is that he is a Nazi, carrier pigeon keeper (he named his favorite pigeon Adolf), and playwright who continues to worship Hitler. In the 2005 film he is seen sending one of his pigeons with a message to Argentina. In an early draft of the script, he was portrayed as Hitler's former butler.

Liebkind is shown to be nervous about his past catching up with him. When Bialystock and Bloom go up to his roof to ask about acquiring the rights to Springtime for Hitler, Liebkind thinks they are from the US government and says 'I vos never a member of ze Nazi Party! I only followed orders! I had nozing to do viz ze vor! I didn't even know zere vos a vor going on! Ve lived in ze back near Switzerland.' While in court for bombing the theater, he hums "America the Beautiful" to try to convince authorities that he's not an immigrant.

In the musical and the 2005 film adaptation of the musical, Liebkind is set to play the role of Hitler in his musical, but breaks a leg and is replaced by Roger De Bris. This differs from the 1967 film, in which Lorenzo St. DuBois (L.S.D.) is cast as Hitler. When in the original he blows up the theatre with Max and Leo, he is hurt the most because he uses a quick-fuse and doesn't escape quickly enough, and is next shown in court in an all-body cast. In the musical and 2005 film, he breaks one of his legs moments before the curtains rise when Max tries to invoke the "Good Luck" superstition, then hours later he tries to flee the police on his broken leg but inevitably breaks the other leg by falling down a flight of stairs. Months later, while Max, Leo and Franz are in Sing Sing Prison, Franz is seen with both legs in casts while playing the piano to the tune of "Prisoners of Love".

Lorenzo St. DuBois

Lorenzo St. DuBois, also known by his initials "L.S.D.", is a charismatic but only semi-coherent, flower power hippie who can barely remember his own name.

L.S.D. is cast as Hitler after he had wandered into the wrong theatre by mistake during the casting call. In the opening performance of Springtime for Hitler, the audience is initially horrified by the tasteless musical play and begins to leave, but L.S.D.'s beatnik-like portrayal of Hitler (and misunderstanding of the story) is found to be hilarious, causing the audience to misinterpret the production as a satire. As a result, Springtime for Hitler is declared a smash hit.

L.S.D. appears only in the 1967 film. In the musical and the 2005 film, Franz Liebkind is cast as Hitler, but breaks a leg and is replaced by Roger De Bris.

References

Lists of film characters
Musical theatre characters
Fictional characters from New York City